Daddy's Girl or Daddy's Girls may refer to:

Literature
 Daddy's Girl, novel originally written in 1971 (but not published until 1980 because of its incestual content) by Charlotte Vale Allen
 Daddy's Girl (graphic novel), a 1996 graphic novel (also about incest) by Debbie Drechsler
 Daddy's Girls (novel), a 2006 novel by Tasmina Perry
 Daddy's Girl, a 2007 anthology novel by Lisa Scottoline

Film
 Daddy's Girl (1918 film), starring Baby Marie Osborne
 Daddy's Girl (1996 film), a film starring William Katt
 Daddy's Girl (2001 film), a British short film
 Daddy's Girl (2002 film), a 2002 British television film starring Martin Kemp
 Daddy's Girl, a 2007 documentary directed by Reggie Rock Bythewood
 Daddy's Girl (2018 film), a 2018 horror film

Television
 Daddy's Girls (1994 TV series), an American sitcom
 Daddy's Girls (2009 TV series), an American reality television series on MTV
 "Daddy's Girl", a 1982 episode of The Facts of Life
 "Daddy's Girl", a 1992 episode of Step by Step
 "Daddy's Girl", a 1995 episode of Can't Hurry Love
 "Daddy's Girl", a 1996 episode of ABC Afterschool Special
 "Daddy's Girls", a 2003 episode of L.A. Dragnet
 "Daddy's Girl", a 2004 episode of She Spies
 "Daddy's Girl", a 2004 episode of 8 Simple Rules
 "Daddy's Girl", a 2004 episode of Tru Calling
 "Daddy's Girl", a 2006 episode of 'Til Death
 "Daddy's Girls", a 2012 episode of Say Yes to the Dress: Atlanta
 "Daddy's Girls", a 2012 episode of Coming Home
 "Daddy's Girl...", a 2012 episode of Don't Trust the B---- in Apartment 23

Music
 Daddy's Girl (opera), a 2007 opera by composer Olli Kortekangas and librettist Michael Baran
 "Daddy's Girl", from the 1984 album Medicine Show by The Dream Syndicate
 "Daddy's Girl", from the 1986 album Solitude/Solitaire by Peter Cetera
 "Daddy's Girl", from the 1992 album Metal For Muthas '92 by Crazy Angel
 "Daddy's Girl", from the 1993 album Face the Heat by Scorpions
 "Daddy's Girl", from the 1993 album Pro-Death Ravers by Psychopomps
 "Daddy's Girl", from the 2006 musical Grey Gardens by Scott Frankel
 "Daddy's Girl", from the 2007 album The Luchagors by The Luchagors
 "Daddy's Girl", from the 2007 album The Yearbook by KJ-52

Other uses
 Hibiscus 'Daddy's Girl', a Hibiscus cultivar flower

See also
 It's Okay, Daddy's Girl, South Korean drama television series
 Daddy's Gurl, Philippine television sitcom
 Daddy's Little Girl (disambiguation)